Choreography may refer to:
 Choreography, the process and result of designing movement sequences
 Choreography (dance), the process and result of designing dances

Computer science
 In choreographic programming, a programming paradigm in which programs are choreographies
 Service choreography, used in business computing

Music
 Choreography (Bright Light Bright Light album)
 Choreography (Lauren Hoffman album)
 Choreography (Vanessa-Mae album)
 "Choreography", a song by Irving Berlin

Other
 N-body choreography, a solution to a particular case of the n-body problem in classical mechanics
 Service choreography, web services-related computing terminology

See also
 "Choreographed" (Law & Order: Special Victims Unit), a TV episode